Khoshknudhan-e Bala (also Romanized as Khoshknūdhān-e Bālā and Khoshk Now Dehān-e Bālā) is a village in Lulaman Rural District, in the Central District of Fuman County, Gilan Province, Iran. At the 2006 census, its population was 1,547, in 416 families.

References 

Populated places in Fuman County